Hasan Semih Özmert (born 27 July 1921 in Üsküdar, Istanbul; died 3 November 2015) was a Turkish judge who served as the president of the Constitutional Court of Turkey from April 9, 1985 to July 27, 1986.

References

External links
Web-site of the Constitutional Court of Turkey 

Presidents of the Constitutional Court of Turkey
Turkish judges
Turkish civil servants
1921 births
2015 deaths
Place of birth missing
Istanbul University Faculty of Law alumni